Doueir (Arabic: دوير, ad-Duwayr), or Dweir, is a village of 7,500 inhabitants in Southern Lebanon near Nabatieh, and  north of the Litani River. It is located directly next to the village of Charkiyeh. Although Doueir is considered a big village, it is the home of many well-known Lebanese such as former Labour minister Ali Qanso, and the late physics scientist Rammal Rammal.

History
In 1875 Victor Guérin   found it to be a large  village with 800 Metuali inhabitants.

During the 2006 Lebanon War, Doueir was among the first targets of the Israel Defense Forces, with a family of 12 killed on July 13. The village has since benefited from investment by the Italian government to build a new olive oil mill.

References

Bibliography

External links
Douair, Localiban 
Voices from the South: Doueir
What's Up Lebanon - Nabatiye

Populated places in Nabatieh District
Shia Muslim communities in Lebanon